The 1973 Rutgers Scarlet Knights football team represented Rutgers University in the 1973 NCAA Division I football season. In their first season under head coach Frank R. Burns, the Scarlet Knights compiled a 6–5 record. The team outscored their opponents 245 to 208. The team's statistical leaders included John Piccirillo with 415 passing yards, J. J. Jennings with 1,353 rushing yards, and Tom Sweeney with 479 receiving yards.

Schedule

References

Rutgers
Rutgers Scarlet Knights football seasons
Rutgers Scarlet Knights football